Janet Perr is an art director, graphic designer, author and illustrator.

She has designed record covers, advertisements, posters, CD packages and book covers and is now the creator of the books Yiddish For Dogs (Hyperion, Sept. 2007) and Yiddish For Babies (Simon & Schuster 2009).

Perr won a Grammy Award for the art direction and design of Cyndi Lauper's debut album She's So Unusual. She has worked with artists such as The Rolling Stones, Run-DMC and Devo. She has also been acknowledged with numerous art directors awards and her work has been featured in the books "Designing For Music" and "1001 Covers".

She attended the Tyler School of Art in Philadelphia and subsequently moved to New York City, where she was a designer at CBS Records and then associate art director at Rolling Stone magazine. Since her stint at Rolling Stone magazine, she has been freelancing and working on her books.

References

External links
 Janet Perr's Official Website

American art directors
American graphic designers
Women graphic designers
American women illustrators
American illustrators
Album-cover and concert-poster artists
Living people
Year of birth missing (living people)
21st-century American women